The 1950–51 SM-sarja season was the 20th season of the SM-sarja, the top level of ice hockey in Finland. 10 teams participated in the league, and Ilves Tampere won the championship.

Regular season

Group A

Group B

3rd place
 HJK Helsinki - TBK Tampere 2:2/1:8

Final 
 Ilves Tampere - Tarmo Hämeenlinna 1:1/4:3

External links
 Season on hockeyarchives.info

Fin
Liiga seasons
1950–51 in Finnish ice hockey